Manavasi Ramaswami Iyer (also known as Saranagati Ramaswami Iyer) was a devotee of Ramana Maharshi. He composed the well-known song Saranagati in his devotion to Ramana Maharshi, which is still sung by devotees of Ramana Maharshi today.

Native to the Manavasi village of Trichy District, Ramaswami Iyer was transferred to a place only 60 kilometres from Tiruvannamalai, Villupuram, where he was the Supervisor of the Public Works Department there. He first went to Tiruvannamalai to meet Ramana Maharshi at the Virupaksha cave in 1907. He was suffering from severe dyspepsia and Ramana Maharshi cured him. Ramaswami Iyer also learned how to compose Tamil kritis from Ramana Maharshi. Ramana Maharshi also saved Ramaswami Iyer from death twice.

Ramaswami Iyer had five daughters and one son. His daughter Rajam was a painter and his daughter Lalitha Venkataraman was a singer.

Ramaswami Iyer planted and watered the massive banyan trees that today exist near the rear part of Ramanashram.

Saranagati

Composition 

Ramaswami Iyer composed his most well-known song, Saranagati (Saraṇāgati or சரணாகதி பாடல்), after coming to the Virupaksha cave to meet Ramana Maharshi after work one day in 1914. He asked Ramana Maharshi in English, "Swami, Jesus Christ, the Buddha and other sages came to the world to redeem the sinners. Is there hope for me?" Ramana Maharshi looked at him and answered, in English, "Yes, there is hope." Inspired by his answer, Ramaswami Iyer composed Saranagati, a song that is popular among many Tamil devotees of Ramana Maharshi to this day.

Lyrics

Other works 
Ramaswami Iyer also composed a song called Ariya Taramamo.

References

External links 
 Saranagati recording from Ramani Ammal, Ramaswami Iyer's daughter
 Saranagati recording
 Recollections from Ramaswami Iyer

Religious composers
People from Karur district